What Would Joey Do? is a 2003 novel in a series by Jack Gantos about the character, Joey Pigza. The title is a play on the Christian phrase "What would Jesus do?", which Mrs. Lapp, Joey's homeschooling tutor, asks him at her doorstep on every visit. The phrase is also a mirror to Joey's own trouble-filled life, as to which choice would be the best for "mopping up the messy corners of his life."

Plot summary
The book deals with Joey as he tries to take charge of correcting his wrongs in his life and the lives of the people he knows, before finally learning that his priority should be doing what's best for himself and leaving the others to their own ways.

The story starts out with his father, Carter Pigza, who also has ADHD, riding his motorcycle noisily around the neighborhood. Joey's mother, Fran, came out screaming at him, resulting in him crashing his motorcycle into an old apple tree, where a branch stabbed him.  Carter was admitted into hospital, but he later ran off.

Throughout the story, Frances had Joey home schooled by her old friend Mrs. Lapp, along with Olivia, Mrs. Lapp's sullen, bratty, blind daughter. Carter kept on bugging their family so Frances had to put out a restraining order to keep him away. Frances was also dating a new boyfriend, Booth Duprey, who was a photographer at her working place and whom Joey disliked.

Joey's grandmother was concerned of Joey having no friends, and persuaded Joey to make friends with Olivia, which Joey found very depressing and tiring, for Olivia's main goal is to either make Joey so miserable he would run off or establishing in her mother's point of view that Joey is up to no good, so as for her to be sent off to a boarding school, where she preferred to be. Olivia stated that many kids like Joey had come to be her homeschooling partner and had gone off, Joey would be the last one her mother would try.

Some time later, Joey's grandmother declared that she would die if Joey could not bring Olivia to meet her and prove that she is Joey's friend. Meanwhile, a performance of the musical Godspell was in town, which happened to be Olivia's favorite show. However, Mrs. Lapp disliked the show due to its novelty portrayal of religion and forbade Olivia from seeing it. Joey and Olivia later struck a deal: Joey finds a way for Olivia to see the show, and she will go to see his grandmother. Olivia then went to meet his grandmother.

During the talk, Olivia revealed that her mother was bitten by a snake while she was pregnant, resulting in her blindness. As her mother is a dedicated Christian, the snake is like an evil being, like Satan. Because of that, Olivia believed she was hopeless and up to no good and behaved like she did. However, after hearing grandma's view on life and her past life, Olivia later confided to Joey that she felt they had a lot in common and it can be implied that she felt better about herself also.

One day, Carter, who wanted a chance to talk with Joey and make it up to Frances, came and stole Pablo, Joey's pet dog. As Carter is unsure exactly which Chihuahua is Joey's, he took all Chihuahuas in town also. Joey ended up returning the dogs to their rightful owners before finally going out to meet his father. One owner, however, had another dog in their depression of their previous one, and the two dogs do not cope. Joey took the extra dog and renamed her Pablita.

Joey advised Carter to be nice to Frances, so that maybe things could get better. But at Thanksgiving, Frances was enraged by the gifts Carter sent and the two had a violent row in front of the house, ruining the party they held and sending a visiting Mrs. Lapp into horror. Joey sprinted after her departing back. When he caught up with her at her home, Mrs. Lapp announced coldly that his family already had enough problems to deal with and for that she would not prefer him to help her in solving Olivia's problems anymore.

Joey's Grandmother died the next day, and Booth broke up with Frances. Seeing that his plans for the others has all gone awry, Joey decided to do as his grandmother told him to; to care more about himself and leave everyone else to care about themselves. Joey arranged the remaining settings for his grandmother's funeral and used some of her savings on buying nice clothes and tickets for him and Olivia to watch her favorite show she had mentioned earlier.
   
Late at the funeral, Frances and Carter had a row again, concerning the disdainful wooden coffin Joey's grandmother was laid in. Joey lashed out, telling them that it was because his grandmother would be cremated. Joey then ran away and in the evening asked Mrs. Lapp for permission to take Olivia to the show. She allowed him to and apologized for her anger in the Thanksgiving night, but maintained her decision of no more home-schooling, though she was happy for a visit occasionally. She told him that Olivia would be sent to a boarding school instead. Olivia was delighted after the show and by now was nicer and friendlier to Joey after all the help he had given her. Joey experienced his first kiss with Olivia before they departed and they promised to keep in touch.

Later, Joey went back to study normally in his old school, and he stated that he was 'where he belonged'.  While his dad 'went in circles' and his mom was 'up in down', Joey decided that it was time he moved in his own direction; forward.

2003 American novels
American young adult novels